Kurt Otto Friedrichs (September 28, 1901 – December 31, 1982) was a noted German-American mathematician. He was the co-founder of the Courant Institute at New York University, and a recipient of the National Medal of Science.

Biography
Friedrichs was born in Kiel, Schleswig-Holstein on September 28, 1901. His family soon moved to Düsseldorf, where he grew up. He attended several different universities in Germany studying the philosophical works of Heidegger and Husserl, but finally decided that mathematics was his real calling. During the 1920s, Friedrichs pursued this field in Göttingen, which had a renowned Mathematical Institute under the direction of Richard Courant. Courant became a close colleague and lifelong friend of Friedrichs.

In 1931, Friedrichs became a full professor of mathematics at the Technische Hochschule in Braunschweig. In early February 1933, a few days after Hitler became the Chancellor of Germany, Friedrichs met and immediately fell in love with a young Jewish student, Nellie Bruell. Their relationship became increasingly challenging and difficult because of the anti-Semitic Nuremberg Laws of Hitler's government. In 1937, both Friedrichs and Nellie Bruell managed to emigrate separately to New York City where they finally married. Their long and very happy marriage produced five children.

Courant had left Germany in 1933 and had founded an institute for graduate studies in mathematics at New York University. Friedrichs joined him when he arrived in 1937 and remained there for forty years. He was instrumental in the development of the Courant Institute of Mathematical Sciences, which eventually became one of the most distinguished research institutes for applied mathematics in the world. Friedrichs died in New Rochelle, New York on December 31, 1982.

Friedrichs's greatest contribution to applied mathematics was his work on partial differential equations. He also did major research and wrote many books and papers on existence theory, numerical methods, differential operators in Hilbert space, non-linear buckling of plates, flows past wings, solitary waves, shock waves, combustion, magneto-fluid dynamical shock waves, relativistic flows, quantum field theory, perturbation of the continuous spectrum, scattering theory, and symmetric hyperbolic equations. With Cartan, Friedrichs gave a "geometrized" formulation of Newtonian gravitation theory—also known
as “Newton–Cartan theory”— and later developed by Dautcourt, Dixon, Dombrowski and Horneffer, Ehlers, Havas, Künzle, Lottermoser, Trautman, and others.

A member of the National Academy of Sciences since 1959, Friedrichs received many honorary degrees and awards for his work. There is a student prize named after Friedrichs at NYU. The American Mathematical Society selected him as the Josiah Willards Gibbs lecturer for 1954. In November 1977, Friedrichs received the National Medal of Science from President Jimmy Carter "for bringing the powers of modern mathematics to bear on problems in physics, fluid dynamics, and elasticity."

Selected bibliography
R. von Mises and K. O. Friedrichs, Fluid Dynamics, Springer-Verlag (1971).
K. O. Friedrichs, Perturbation of Spectra in Hilbert Space, American Mathematical Society (1965).
K. O. Friedrichs, Mathematical aspects of the quantum theory of fields, Interscience (1953).
K. O. Friedrichs, Spectral Theory of Operators in Hilbert Space, Springer-Verlag (1981).
. A selection from Friedrichs' works with a biography and commentaries of David Isaacson, Fritz John, Tosio Kato, Peter Lax, Louis Nirenberg, Wolfgang Wasow, Harold Weitzner.

See also
Mollifier

References

External links

National Academy of Sciences Biographical Memoir

1901 births
1982 deaths
Scientists from Kiel
Scientists from New Rochelle, New York
20th-century German mathematicians
20th-century American mathematicians
National Medal of Science laureates
Members of the United States National Academy of Sciences
PDE theorists
Operator theorists
Courant Institute of Mathematical Sciences faculty
Academic staff of the Technical University of Braunschweig
Mathematicians from New York (state)
German emigrants to the United States